Passport is a 1961 Indian Bollywood drama film directed by Pramod Chakravorty. The film stars Madhubala and Pradeep Kumar.

Passport was released in October 1961 and became a commercial success. It was the last film to star Madhubala and Kumar together, and also one of the last films of Madhubala.

Plot
The film starts with a smuggler Samson D'Mello, bringing some jewellery illegally to India from Nairobi. However the customs police detect it, as soon as he crosses the customs barrier. A chase starts, at the end of which D'Mello dies as his car meets an accident. It soon turns out that he was smuggling jewellery for Shamsher Singh (K N Singh), who was a partner of Bhagwandas (Nazir Hussain) who owns a jewellery shop.

While assisting the Bombay Police in arresting jewellery smugglers, Shekhar (Pradeep Kumar) suspects Bhagwandas (Nazir Hussain). But soon, he discovers that Bhagwandas is the father of Rita, his love interest (Madhubala).

Meanwhile an accountant of  Bhagwandas dies mysteriously. This accountant had knowledge of all ill deals of the duo. Shekhar tries to find the guilty man. He comes across Shamsher Singh & tries to catch him. Bhagwandas's daughter Rita tries to help Shekhar. When he tries to inform the police, Singh starts blackmailing him. Shekhar tries to stop Singh from smuggling but instead, Singh tries to kill Shekhar.

Spoiler alert
Soon the police comes to know that Singh is actually Shyamlal who has run from Nairobi after murdering someone. Shekhar helps the police to catch Singh. The film ends on a happy note.

Cast
The main cast of the film included:
Madhubala as Rita Bhagwandas 
Pradeep Kumar as Shekhar
Helen as Mary
K. N. Singh as Shamsher Singh / Shyamlal
Nazir Hussain as Bhagwandas 
Mumtaz Begum as Mrs. Bhagwandas 
Shivraj as Benny Prasad
Dulari as Mrs. Benny Prasad
Jagdish Raj as Police Inspector
Moni Chatterjee as Passport officer
Narmada Shankar as Munimji
C. S. Dubey as Employee at Bhagwandas Jewellers
Moolchand as Employee at Bhagwandas Jewellers
 Bhagwan Sinha as employee at jewellers
 Kumud Tripathi as Joseph Pinto, employee at jewellers
 V. Gopal as Janardan
 Mirajkar as Swami, employee at jewellers
 Manju as Garib Singh, employee at jewellers
 Rajan Kapoor as Police Inspector Verma in Suite
 Lillian as Lily
 Shetty as Singh's driver
 Pachhi as Turkish diamond smuggler

Soundtrack
The soundtrack of Passport was composed by Kalyanji–Anandji and lyrics were penned by Qamar Jalalabadi and Farooq Kaiser. "Saaz-E-Dil Chhed De" was a chartbuster.

Reception
Passport was released at the peak of Madhubala's popularity and craze. The film consequently emerged as one of the biggest commercial successes of the year 1961, according to Filmfare.

References

External links 
 

1961 films
1960s Hindi-language films
Indian black-and-white films